Callum Atkinson (born 14 April 1997) is a Scottish qualified, English rugby union player for Edinburgh in the Pro14. Atkinson's primary position is lock.

Career
Atkinson made his debut for Edinburgh on 26 October 2018.

References

1997 births
Living people
English rugby union players
Sportspeople from Macclesfield
Edinburgh Rugby players
Rugby union locks
Rugby union players from Macclesfield